Gary R. Lock is a British archaeologist and emeritus professor at the School of Archaeology, University of Oxford. He is noted for his contributions to computational archaeology.

Work in the UK
In the 1980s Lock became involved in computational archaeology, working on a database for Danebury, an iron age hillfort in Hampshire which was excavated under the direction of Barry Cunliffe. In 1987 he was co-author of Computer Archaeology in the Shire Archaeology series. Interest in computational archaeology and prehistoric hillforts are also evidenced in more recent work, for example Using computers in archaeology: towards virtual pasts (2003) and his contribution to a project to create a comprehensive database of prehistoric hillforts in the British Isles, the Atlas of Hillforts of Britain and Ireland (launched online in 2017).

Lock has been a fellow of Kellogg College since 1993, serving as the secretary to its governing body from 1997 to 1998 and Dean of Degrees in 2010.

Work abroad
He was formerly the chair of Computer Applications and Quantitative Applications in Archaeology (CAA) International.

He has been involved with archaeological projects on the continent: 
 Najarilla valley, Spain
 Sangro Valley Project, Italy. Together with John Lloyd, he initiated this longue durée project in 1994.

Selected publications

References 

1948 births
British archaeologists
Prehistorians
Fellows of Kellogg College, Oxford
Living people